Bethania Township is one of fifteen townships in Forsyth County, North Carolina, United States. The township had a population of 9,200 according to the 2010 census.

Geographically, Bethania Township occupies  in northern Forsyth County.  The town of Rural Hall is located here as well as part of the town of Bethania.

References

Townships in Forsyth County, North Carolina
Townships in North Carolina